Yvonne Hasler (born 13 October 1968) is a Liechtenstein former heptathlete and sprinter. She competed in the women's 200 metres at the 1988 Summer Olympics.

References

External links
 

1968 births
Living people
Athletes (track and field) at the 1988 Summer Olympics
Liechtenstein female sprinters
Olympic athletes of Liechtenstein
Place of birth missing (living people)
Olympic female sprinters